Scott McCord (born April 19, 1971) is a Canadian actor. He is known for his versatility and character work in film, television, animation and on stage. He is a Lifetime Member of The Actors Studio. On television he has appeared in series regular, recurring and guest starring roles. He plays the mysterious Victor in the MGM/Epix original science fiction horror series From from the executive producers of Lost. Other television  appearances include The Sinner, FBI, Jupiter's Legacy, and Lost Girl.   He played researcher James Joy on the Canadian investigative journalism drama series The Eleventh Hour from 2002 to 2005.  He has appeared in standout character roles in the studio films 16 Blocks, Shoot 'Em Up, and supporting roles in independent films East of Middle West, Blood Honey and the animated features The Nut Job and Charlotte. He has worked in theatre most of his career in New York and Toronto, garnering a Dora Mavor Moore Award Best Actor nomination in 2002 for The Qualities of Zero.

He is known for his voiceover work in popular animated series. He plays Dan Kuso in Bakugan Battle Brawlers, Tetsuya Watarigani in Beyblade: Metal Fusion, Owen, Trent, Jacques and Brody in Fresh TV's Total Drama franchise, Skull Boy in Ruby Gloom, McGee in Camp Lakebottom, and Jake in the animated Nickelodeon/TVOKids television series, PAW Patrol. In 2016, he won the Canada Screens Award for Best Performance in an Animated Series.

As a musician, he has released two albums, the solo effort Blues For Sunshine (2009) and Scott McCord and the Bonafide Truth (2012). Scott McCord and the Bonafide Truth were nominated for Best Artist of the Year at the Canadian 2010 Maple Blues Awards.

Filmography

Television

Film

Video games

References

External links
 
 

Living people
Canadian male film actors
Canadian male television actors
Canadian male video game actors
Canadian male voice actors
20th-century Canadian male actors
21st-century Canadian male actors
Animal impersonators
1971 births